This is a list of universities and colleges in the State of Palestine, contemplating both the Gaza Strip and the West Bank. The West Bank and Gaza together have 14 universities, an open university for distance learning, 18 university colleges and 20 community colleges.

Gaza Strip
Al-Aqsa University
Al-Azhar University - Gaza
Al-Quds Open University
Gaza University
Islamic University of Gaza
Israa University
Palestine Technical College
University College of Applied Sciences
University of Palestine
Gaza Community/Training Center
 University Hassan 2

West Bank
Al-Quds University
Al-Quds Open University
An-Najah National University
Arab American University
Bethlehem Bible College
Bethlehem University
Birzeit University
Dar Al-Kalima University
Edward Said National Conservatory of Music
Hebron University
Ibrahimieh College
Khodori Institute, Tulkarm
 Palestine Ahliya University
Palestine Polytechnic University
International Academy of Art, Palestine

Other education and research institutions
Applied Research Institute–Jerusalem
Health, Development, Information and Policy Institute
Palestinian Academic Network
Palestinian Academic Society for the Study of International Affairs
Palestinian Ministry of Education and Higher Education

Education and research organizations outside Palestine
 Durham Palestine Educational Trust
 Institute for Middle East Understanding
 Institute for Palestine Studies
 Scientists 4 Palestine
 PEACE Programme - under the auspices of UNESCO

References
 Medea’s information files: Palestinian Universities (Internet Archive version of July 2007)

Notes

Universities
Palestinian universities, List of
Palestinian Territories
Universities